News Journal  is a common name for newspapers:

Nigeria
The News Journal (Nigeria), weekly newspaper in Western State

United States
 The News Journal is a newspaper in Wilmington, Delaware.
 The Daytona Beach News-Journal, daily newspaper serving Volusia and Flagler counties in Florida
 Pensacola News Journal, daily newspaper serving Escambia and Santa Rosa counties in Florida
 News Journal (Corbin), weekly newspaper serving Knox, Laurel and Whitley counties in Kentucky
 Mansfield News Journal, daily newspaper from Mansfield, Richland County, Ohio, and serving north-central Ohio
 News Journal (Ohio), daily newspaper in Wilmington, Clinton County, Ohio
 Clovis News Journal, daily newspaper based in Clovis, Curry County, New Mexico
 The Daily News Journal, newspaper from Murfreesboro, Rutherford County, Tennessee
 Alice Echo-News Journal, daily newspaper based in Alice, Jim Wells County, Texas
 Longview News-Journal, daily newspaper based in Longview, Gregg County, Texas
 Box Elder News Journal, newspaper in Brigham City, Box Elder County, Utah

See also
Journal News (disambiguation), several publications
Stroud News & Journal, a weekly newspaper in Stroud, Gloucestershire, England

News Journal